Ancistrus tombador is a species of catfish in the family Loricariidae. It is native to South America, where it is known to occur in small rivers in the state of Mato Grosso in Brazil. The species reaches 6.3 cm (2.5 inches) SL and is distinguished from other members of the genus Ancistrus (except A. reisi and A. jataiensis) by the absence of an adipose fin, which in this species is replaced by a series of unpaired platelets that form a low crest. The specific epithet of this species refers to Serra do Tombador, where the type specimen was collected.

References 

Fish described in 2005
tombador